Miller-Porter-Lacy House, also known as the Lacy House, is a historic home located at St. Joseph, Missouri.  The original section was built in 1883, as an Italianate style brick farmhouse.  It was enlarged and remodeled in 1902 by the architect Edmond Jacques Eckel (1845–1934) in the Colonial Revival / Georgian Revival style.  It is a large brick dwelling with a low hipped roof. It features Tuscan order columned porches and a porte cochere.  Also on the property is a contributing carriage house and croquet and tennis court sites.

It was listed on the National Register of Historic Places in 1982.

References

Houses on the National Register of Historic Places in Missouri
Italianate architecture in Missouri
Colonial Revival architecture in Missouri
Georgian Revival architecture in Missouri
Houses completed in 1902
Houses in St. Joseph, Missouri
National Register of Historic Places in Buchanan County, Missouri